The point nomination system was as the upper level tiers and somewhat strange than the ordinary one. For a win there was a nomination of three points, a draw - two points, and a loss would earn a point. For a failure to appear a point was deducted and the technical loss would be nominated.

League standings

The spring championship

The highest scoring game was between the Piatigorsk's and the Gorky's clubs ending in 7:3.

The fall championship

The highest scoring game was between the Dnipropetrovsk's and the Kyiv's clubs ending in 2:4.

See also
 Soviet Second League B
 Soviet Second League 1936
 Soviet First League 1936
 1936 Soviet Top League

1936
4